The Tonocotés or Tonokotés are an aboriginal people inhabiting the provinces of Santiago del Estero and Tucumán in Argentina.

The Spaniards called the tonocotés and other peoples of the former Tucumán as Juríes, deformation of the Quechua word xuri that means Rhea, because of the kind of loincloth feathers of this bird that the natives wore and that they moved into real flocks. In 1574 the name of tonocoté appears on a document and eventually supplanted the earlier denomination.

They belong to brasílido type: height and nose are median and have broad face. They received a strong influence of Andean cultures, being sedentary and practicing agriculture, hunting, fishing and gathering.

In ancient times inhabited the south-central plains of Santiago del Estero and the current city. Limited to the north by the lules, south by the sanavirones, west to the diaguitas and east by the Salado River.

The houses were built on artificial mounds forming elevation, were round and made with slightly durable material and thatch. Enclosed their villages with palisades.

The annual flooding of the Dulce and Salado rivers were used to irrigate their crops of corn, quinoa, beans and squash. Raised llamas and ostriches. They also practiced collecting algarroba, chañar, opuntia and wild honey.

They also developed the loom, feather ornaments and basketry.

Their main god was Cacanchic, the protector of crops.

From its original language only are preserved two words: Gasta and Gualamba, assumed mean people and large respectively. This was studied by Father Alonso de Bárzana.

By 1480 the Inca Empire occupied northwestern Argentina, incorporating part of the tonocotés.

Current tonocotés are known as suritas. They are partially mestizos descended from the ancient tonocotés and speak their own dialect derived from Santiago del Estero's quichua. They are distributed in 19 rural communities with about 6,000 residents in the departments of San Martín, Figueroa and Avellaneda from Santiago del Estero.
(According to the 2010 national census, the tonocotés village had 4,853 inhabitants)

Communities
 In the Alberdi Department
 Aboriginal Community Mistolito

 In the Avellaneda Department
 Indigenous community tonokoté Mailín Ñaupa (from Villa Maulín)
 Indigenous community tonokoté Breáyoj
 Indigenous community tonokoté Taqo Sombreana (from San Antonio de Copo)
 Paso Grande
 Pozo Mosoj
 San Roque
 Tala Atun

 In San Martín Department
 Aboriginal Community Linton
 La Blanca

 In the Figueroa Department
 Aboriginal Community Canteros

References 

Indigenous peoples in Argentina
Indigenous peoples of the Gran Chaco